Hugh Abernethy (born 23 December 1967) is a Scottish former professional snooker player.

Career

Born in Scotland in 1967, Abernethy turned professional in 1994. His career was largely without any success, and he never rose above 80th in the world rankings, having to regain his place on tour in 1998 after losing it in 1997. He reached the last 32 of the 1999 Benson & Hedges Championship, losing 3–5 to Matt Wilson, and the 1999 and 2000 editions of the Thailand Masters, where he was defeated 3–5 by Mark Williams and 2–5 by Ken Doherty respectively.

Abernethy reached his first career final at the 2001 Benson & Hedges Championship, where he held Ryan Day to 5–5 but was defeated 5–9 by the Welshman.

Having been the finalist in a qualifying event in 1998, he won a tournament on the Challenge Tour in 2003, a 6–0 victory over Gary Wilson earning Abernethy a place back on tour for the 2004/05 and 2005/06 seasons. However, he lost his professional status once more in 2006, at the age of 38.

Career finals

Non-ranking finals: 3 (1 title)

References

Scottish snooker players
1967 births
Living people